The Valea Albă is a right tributary of the river Câlniștea in Romania. It discharges into the Câlniștea in Drăgănești-Vlașca.

References

Rivers of Romania
Rivers of Teleorman County